Metaporana obtusa is a species of plant in the family Convolvulaceae endemic to Yemen.  Its natural habitat is subtropical or tropical dry forests.

References

Endemic flora of Socotra
obtusa
Vulnerable plants
Taxonomy articles created by Polbot
Taxa named by Isaac Bayley Balfour